The Lord Howe flax snail or the Lord Howe placostylus, scientific name Placostylus bivaricosus, is a species of large air-breathing land snail, a terrestrial pulmonate gastropod mollusc in the family Bothriembryontidae.

Distribution
This large snail is found only on Lord Howe Island off the east coast of Australia. Its conservation status has declined from common to endangered since rats were accidentally introduced to this World Heritage island in 1918.

Subspecies 
Subspecies of Placostylus bivaricosus include:
 Placostylus bivaricosus bivaricosus (Gaskoin, 1855)
 Placostylus bivaricosus etheridgei (Hedley, 1891) - extinct
 Placostylus bivaricosus cuniculinsulae (Cox, 1872)
 Placostylus bivaricosus solidus (Brazier in Etheridge, 1889)

Description
The genus Placostylus is a group of large ground dwelling gastropods with a disjunct distribution in the South west Pacific from the Solomon Islands, Fiji, and New Caledonia, to Lord Howe Island and the northern extremity of New Zealand. The Lord Howe flax snail has a brown, pointed shell up to 7 cm long and 2 cm in diameter.

Conservation

Species decline
Historical accounts and fossil evidence indicate that the Lord Howe Island flax snail was formerly widespread and abundant on the island. The decline was first noted in the 1940s and the species is now listed as critically endangered.

The black rat is considered to be the major predator of this species and likely to be a significant threat to its survival. European blackbirds and song thrushes (self-introduced around 1950) are also thought to be predators of the snail.

Habitat clearing and modification and habitat disturbance, possibly herbicides and pesticides also add to the species decline.

Recovery
In 2001, a recovery plan was completed to protect and recover the Lord Howe Island flax snail in the wild. Actions include habitat and population surveys, community awareness raising and a captive-breeding program.

The Lord Howe Island Board, responsible for implementation of the recovery plan, has since constructed a rodent and bird proof enclosure for the project and the first generation of captive bred Lord Howe Island land snails has hatched.

Over a period of two years, schoolchildren will closely monitor the captive snail population and their eggs, and will then measure growth rates and survival rates of the juvenile snails.

Rodent control or eradication on the island is crucial for the long-term survival of this snail in the wild.

References

External links
 description in Latin language
Threatened Species Profile Lord Howe Island Land Snail (Australian Government, Department of Environment and Water Resources)
 Placostylus Captive Breeding (Foundation for National Parks & Wildlife
 Rodent eradication on Lord Howe Island (Foundation for National Parks & Wildlife)
 Gaskoin, J. S. (1855). Descriptions of two new species of land shells. Proceedings of the Zoological Society of London. 22: 152
 Cox, J.C. (1872). Descriptions of new land-shells from Australia and the South-Sea islands. Poceedings of the Zoological Society of London. 1872: 18-23
 Hedley, C. (1891). The land and freshwater shells of Lord Howe Island. Records of the Australian Museum. 1: 134-143
 Brazier, J. (1889). Mollusca. In: Etheridge, R (ed.) The general zoology of Lord Howe Island; containing also an account of the collections made by the Australian Museum Collecting Party, Aug.–Sept., 1887, pp. 22-30. Memoirs of the Australian Museum. 2: 1-42.
 Iredale, T. (1944). The land Mollusca of Lord Howe Island. The Australian Zoologist. 10(3): 299-334
 Clench, W. J. (1941). The land Mollusca of the Solomon Islands (Succineidae, Bulimulidae and Partulidae). American Museum Novitates. 1129: 1-21
 Solem A. (1959). "Systematics of the land and fresh-water mollusca of the New Hebrides". Fieldiana 43(1): page 131

 

Gastropods of Lord Howe Island
Placostylus
Gastropods described in 1854